Iraklis Garoufalias (born 1 May 1993) is a Greek professional footballer who plays as a defensive midfielder for Super League 2 club AEL.

External links
 
 http://www.superleaguegreece.net/el/teams/team/pas-giannina-324/2014-2015-superleague-42/players/garoufalias-iraklis-1942

1993 births
Living people
Greek expatriate footballers
AEK Athens F.C. players
Asteras Magoula F.C. players
Fostiras F.C. players
PAS Giannina F.C. players
Atromitos F.C. players
Apollon Smyrnis F.C. players
Olympiakos Nicosia players
Athlitiki Enosi Larissa F.C. players
Super League Greece players
Football League (Greece) players
Gamma Ethniki players
Super League Greece 2 players
Cypriot First Division players
Greek expatriate sportspeople in Cyprus
Expatriate footballers in Cyprus
Association football midfielders
Footballers from Athens
Greek footballers